Sphaeralcea laxa, with the common name caliche globemallow, is a desert plant in the mallow family (Malvaceae).

References

laxa